Myeik University (formerly Myeik College and Myeik Degree College) is a university in Myeik, Myanmar. The university was founded as Myeik College on 24 September 1999, upgraded to Myeik Degree College on 27 November 2001 and to its present name, Myeik University, on 14 May 2003.

Members of Myeik University, alongside the Myanmar Bird and Nature Society, identified 20 new bird species in Myanmar from 2010 to 2014.

References

External links
Official website

Universities and colleges in Myanmar